Formula Continental is a single seater, open wheel racing class in motorsport.  It replaced Formula C as an SCCA racing class. 

Most Formula Continental's are Formula Ford 2000 (FF2000) models, which is a flat bottomed, steel tube frame open wheel car with smaller wings and a 2-litre engine derived from the steel blocked Ford Pinto, Ford Zetec, or Mazda MZR engines.

Formula Continental at the SCCA National Championship Runoffs

Continental
Sports Car Club of America